is a Japanese video game developer best known for developing games published by Nintendo with the Fire Emblem, Paper Mario, WarioWare, and Wars video game series. Originally, the company was headquartered at the Nintendo Kyoto Research Center in Higashiyama-ku, Kyoto, but later moved to a building near Nintendo's main headquarters in October 2013. They were also responsible for the creation of various development hardware both first and 3rd party developers would use to make games for Nintendo systems, such as the IS Nitro Emulator, the official development kit for the Nintendo DS.

History 
Intelligent Systems started when programmer Toru Narihiro was hired by Nintendo to port Famicom Disk System software to the standard ROM-cartridge format that was being used outside Japan on the NES. Similarly to the origins of HAL Laboratory, the team soon became an auxiliary program unit for Nintendo that provided system tools and hired people to program, fix, or port Nintendo-developed software. Much of the team's original work consists of minor contributions to larger games developed by Nintendo R&D1 and Nintendo EAD.

Narihiro programmed his first video games, Famicom Wars and Fire Emblem: Shadow Dragon and the Blade of Light, towards the end of the Famicom's life cycle, although the game design, graphic design, and music was provided by the Nintendo R&D1 team. Because of Narihiro's success, Intelligent Systems began to hire graphic designers, programmers, and musicians to extend the company from an auxiliary–tool developer to a game development group. The company continued to develop new entries in the Wars and Fire Emblem franchises.

In 2000, Intelligent Systems produced Paper Mario for the Nintendo 64, which became a surprise hit, leading to five sequels. Three years later, the first entry in the WarioWare series was released on the Game Boy Advance, and it too became a successful series.

Not all games developed by Intelligent Systems are published by Nintendo. Cubivore: Survival of the Fittest (which was co-developed by Intelligent Systems) was published by Atlus in North America; Intelligent Systems also developed various Dragon Quest games, which were published by Square Enix.

List of games developed 

Notes

Cancelled

See also 
 OrCAD (distributed by Intelligent Systems Japan, KK)

References

External links
 

 
Nintendo
Nintendo divisions and subsidiaries
Video game companies of Japan
Video game development companies
Companies based in Kyoto
Video game companies established in 1986
Japanese companies established in 1986
Paper Mario
Fire Emblem